Theoderich von Wied (also called Dietrich of Wied or Theodoric II; c. 1170 – 28 March 1242) was Archbishop and Prince-elector of Trier from 1212 until his death.

Life
He was the son of Count Dietrich I of Wied (died about 1200), a follower of Emperor Frederick Barbarossa in the Third Crusade. His brother Rudolf, Theoderich's uncle, was already elected Archbishop of Trier in 1183, however, he was denied by Pope Lucius III who favoured his rival Folmar of Karden. Theoderich began his ecclesiastical career about 1189; from about 1196, he served as provost of St. Kunibert's in Cologne, from 1205 also of Rees on the Lower Rhine. In 1210 he is documented as archdeacon at Trier and provost of St. Paulinus' Church. 

Elected archbishop upon the death of his predecessor John I on 15 July 1212, he soon entered into a fierce quarrel with the Rhenish count Henry II of Nassau over the erection of Montabaur Castle on the right bank of the Rhine. Henry had the fortress devastated and the archbishop arrested, nevertheless Theoderich was able to finish the construction two years later. 

Like his ancestors, he remained a loyal supporter of the Imperial House of Hohenstaufen, backing the young king Frederick II against his Welf rival Otto IV, which earned him the opposition of his counterparts in Cologne and Mainz. He also ensured the election of Frederick's son Henry (VII) as King of the Romans in 1220 and his coronation by Archbishop Engelbert of Cologne two years later. He remained a close confidant of the emperor, whom he accompanied to Italy and Sicily, and also of His son Henry (VII) until his rebellion in 1234.

Theoderich also took care of his Trier principality. Under his rule construction was begun on the Liebfrauenkirche (Church of Our Lady) in approximately 1230 AD. He consecrated Limburg Cathedral in 1235 AD and also promoted the establishment of the Order of Saint John in Trier and of a Teutonic Order commandry in Koblenz (at the later Deutsches Eck). He acquired the Eifel estates around Malberg and had Kyllburg Castle erected about 1240.

Theoderich was buried in the Cathedral of Trier.

References

Archbishops of Trier
13th-century Roman Catholic archbishops in the Holy Roman Empire
1170s births
1242 deaths

Year of birth uncertain